Krenov or Křenov may refer to:

Places in the Czech Republic
Křenov, a municipality and village in the Pardubice Region
Křenov, a village and part of Bernartice (Trutnov District) in the Hradec Králové Region
Křenov, a hamlet and part of Dubá in the Liberec Region
Křenov, a village and part of Kájov in the South Bohemian Region

People
James Krenov (1920–2009), Russian-American woodworker